Udzungwomyia is a genus of fly in the family Dolichopodidae from Tanzania and South Africa. It contains two species, Udzungwomyia morogoro and Udzungwomyia simoni. The generic name comes from the Udzungwa Mountains National Park, where the type species (Udzungwomyia morogoro) was collected. It is placed in the subfamily Medeterinae, tribe Udzungwomyiini.

Species
 Udzungwomyia morogoro Grichanov, 2018
 Udzungwomyia simoni Grichanov, 2019

References

Dolichopodidae genera
Medeterinae
Diptera of Africa